Simon McCormack (born 12 February 1972) is an Australian diver. He competed in the men's 3 metre springboard event at the 1992 Summer Olympics.

References

External links
 

1972 births
Living people
Australian male divers
Olympic divers of Australia
Divers at the 1992 Summer Olympics
Place of birth missing (living people)
Commonwealth Games medallists in diving
Commonwealth Games bronze medallists for Australia
Divers at the 1990 Commonwealth Games
20th-century Australian people
21st-century Australian people
Medallists at the 1990 Commonwealth Games